Origanum cordifolium is a subshrub with suberect, cylindrical, hairless, often purplish shoots, 40–60 cm high. Leaves opposite, simple, entire or irregularly dentate, stalkless, ovoid to cordate, 1–2 x 0.8–2 cm, leathery, hairless, acute. Flowers on pendulous spikes, zygomorphic, corolla bifid, whitish or pinkish, 1–4, subtended by purplish-green, large bracts. Flowers June–August. Fruit of 4 nutlets.

Habitat
Moist, shady rocky slopes, by streams and roadbanks on igneous rocks at 300–900 m.

Distribution
Endemic to Cyprus found In a limited area of the Paphos Forest in Roudhia valley (Alonoudhi, Steni etc.)

References

External links

cordifolium
Endemic flora of Cyprus